Phonofilm is an optical sound-on-film system developed by inventors Lee de Forest and Theodore Case in the early 1920s.

Introduction
In 1919 and 1920, Lee De Forest, inventor of the audion tube, filed his first patents on a sound-on-film process, DeForest Phonofilm, which recorded sound directly onto film as parallel lines. These parallel lines photographically recorded electrical waveforms from a microphone, which were translated back into sound waves when the movie was projected. Some sources say that DeForest improved on the work of Finnish inventor Eric Tigerstedt — who was granted German patent 309.536 on 28 July 1914 for his sound-on-film work — and on the Tri-Ergon Exchange, patented in 1919 by German inventors Josef Engl, Hans Vogt, and Joseph Massole.

The Phonofilm system, which recorded synchronized sound directly onto film, was used to record vaudeville acts, musical numbers, political speeches, and opera singers. The quality of Phonofilm was poor at first, improved somewhat in later years, but was never able to match the fidelity of sound-on-disc systems such as Vitaphone, or later sound-on-film systems such as RCA Photophone or Fox Movietone.

The films of DeForest were short films made primarily as demonstrations to try to interest major studios in Phonofilm. These films are particularly valuable to entertainment historians, as they include recordings of a wide variety of both well-known and less famous American vaudeville and British music hall acts which would otherwise have been forgotten. Some of the films, such as Flying Jenny Airplane, Barking Dog, and a film of DeForest himself explaining the Phonofilm system (all 1922) were experimental films to test the system.

Some of the people filmed included vaudevillians Joe Weber and Lew Fields, Eva Puck and Sammy White, Eddie Cantor, Ben Bernie, Oscar Levant, Phil Baker, Frank McHugh, Roy Smeck, jazz musicians Noble Sissle and Eubie Blake, "all-female" bandleader Helen Lewis, harmonicist Borrah Minevitch, Nikita Balieff's company La Chauve-Souris, opera singers Eva Leoni, Abbie Mitchell, and Marie Rappold, Broadway stars Helen Menken and Fannie Ward, folklorist Charles Ross Taggart, copla singer Concha Piquer (first Spanish sound film), and politicians Calvin Coolidge, Robert La Follette, Al Smith, and Franklin D. Roosevelt. Smith and Roosevelt were filmed during the 1924 Democratic National Convention, held June 24 to July 9 at Madison Square Garden in New York City. Coolidge became the first U. S. President to appear in a sound motion picture when DeForest filmed him at the White House on 11 August 1924.

In November 1922, De Forest founded the De Forest Phonofilm Corporation with studios at 314 East 48th Street in New York City, and offices at 220 West 42nd Street in the Candler Building. However, DeForest was unable to interest any of the major Hollywood movie studios in his invention.

Premiere of Phonofilm
From October 1921 to September 1922, DeForest lived in Berlin, meeting with the Tri-Ergon developers and investigating other European sound film systems. He announced to the press in April 1922 that he would soon have a workable sound-on-film system.

On 12 March 1923, DeForest presented a demonstration of Phonofilm to the press. On 12 April 1923, DeForest gave a private demonstration of the process to electrical engineers at the Engineering Society Building's Auditorium at 33 West 39th Street in New York City.

On 15 April 1923, DeForest premiered 18 short films made in Phonofilm — including vaudeville acts, musical performers, opera, and ballet — at the Rivoli Theater at 1620 Broadway in New York City. The Rivoli's music director Hugo Riesenfeld co-hosted the presentation. The printed program gave credit to the "DeForest-Case Patents", but according to a letter Theodore Case wrote to DeForest immediately after the event, no credit was given to Case during the presentation itself. Case also expressed his displeasure that the program credited only the "DeForest-Case Patents", as Phonofilm's success was fully due to the work of Case and his Case Research Lab.

DeForest later took his show on the road, pitching Phonofilm directly to the general public at a series of special engagements across the country. The shorts shown at one such demonstration (from an original program at History San Jose, which holds DeForest's papers), exact date unknown but circa 1925, were as follows:

(Overture)
What the Phonofilm Means (Bart Doyle [?])
A Study in Contrasts (comparing sound and silent film segments)
From Far Seville (Concha Piquer)
Old Melodies (Charles Ross Taggart)
The Harlequin's Serenade [no other identification, adaptation of Harlequinade by Riccardo Drigo (d. 1930)] 
Stringed Harmony (Roy Smeck)
Parade of the Wooden Soldiers [Franco-Russian ballet troupe Le Chauve Souris]
A Few Moments With Eddie Cantor, Star of "Kid Boots"
A Musical Monologue (with Phil Baker)
President Calvin Coolidge Taken on the White House Lawn (11 August 1924)
(Intermission—Five Minutes)
Ben Bernie's Orchestra ("Ben Bernie and All the Lads")
Rigoletto, Act Two (Eva Leoni [1895-1972] and Company)
The Bubble Dance (Lillian Powell)
Weber and Fields (their famous poolhall skit)
A Boston Star (Borrah Minevitch)
DeWolfe [sic] Hopper (reciting "Casey at the Bat")
Negro Folk Songs (Noble Sissle and Eubie Blake)
Opera Versus Jazz (Eva Puck and Sammy White)
(Exit March—by the Phonofilm)

DeForest was forced to show these films in independent theaters such as the Rivoli, since Hollywood movie studios controlled all major U.S. movie theater chains at the time. De Forest's decision to film primarily short films (one reel), not feature films limited the appeal of his process.

All or part of the Paramount Pictures features Bella Donna (premiered 1 April 1923) and The Covered Wagon (premiered 16 March 1923) were filmed with Phonofilm as an experiment. (In the case of The Covered Wagon, Hugo Riesenfeld composed the music for the film.) However, the Phonofilm versions were only shown at the premiere engagements, also at the Rivoli. "Siegfried", the first part of the Fritz Lang film Die Nibelungen (1924) had a Phonofilm soundtrack, but only at the New York City premiere at the Century Theatre on 23 August 1925.<ref>[http://www.silentera.com/PSFL/data/C/CoveredWagon1923.html SilentEra entry for The Covered Wagon]</ref>SilentEra entry for Siegfried

One of the few two-reel films made by DeForest in the Phonofilm process was Love's Old Sweet Song (1923), starring Louis Wolheim, Donald Gallaher, and the 20-year-old Una Merkel. DeForest kept to one-reel films because he was unable to solve the problem of reel changes—and the disruption in sound which would occur—when a projectionist in a movie theater changed reels.

Development of Phonofilm
Max Fleischer and Dave Fleischer used the Phonofilm process for their Song Car-Tunes series of cartoons—all featuring the "Follow the Bouncing Ball" gimmick—starting in May 1924. Of the 36 titles in the Song Car-Tunes series, 19 used Phonofilm. Also in 1924, the Fleischer brothers partnered with DeForest, Edwin Miles Fadiman, and Hugo Riesenfeld to form Red Seal Pictures Corporation, which owned 36 theaters on the East Coast, extending as far west as Cleveland, Ohio.

Red Seal Pictures and DeForest Phonofilm filed for bankruptcy in September 1926, and the Fleischers stopped releasing the Song Car-Tune films in Phonofilm shortly thereafter. Alfred Weiss acquired several of the silent Song Car-tunes including "My Old Kentucky Home" and "Tramp-Tram--Tramp, the Boys are Marching" and re-released them independently between 1929 to 1932 with new animation added using what sounds like the Powers Cinephone process.

DeForest also worked with Theodore Case, using Case's patents to make the Phonofilm system workable. However, the two men had a falling out, shortly after DeForest filed suit in June 1923 against Freeman Harrison Owens, another former collaborator of DeForest's. Case later went to movie mogul William Fox of Fox Film Corporation, who bought Case's patents, the American rights to the German Tri-Ergon patents, and the work of Owens to create Fox Movietone.

DeForest's use of Case patents
Case's falling out with DeForest was due to DeForest taking full credit for the work of Case and Earl I. Sponable (1895–1977) at the Case Research Lab in Auburn, New York. To record on film, DeForest tried using a standard light bulb to expose amplified sound onto film. The bulbs quickly burned out, and, even while functioning, never produced a clear recording. To reproduce his nearly inaudible soundtracks, DeForest used a photocell that could not react quickly enough to the varying light coming to it as the soundtrack passed through the sound gate, resulting in an incomplete reproduction of sound from an inadequate recording—a dual failure. DeForest's attempts to record and reproduce sound failed at every turn until he used inventions provided by Case.

Having failed to create a workable sound-on-film system by 1921, DeForest contacted Case to inquire about using a Case Research Lab invention, the Thallofide (thallium oxysulfide) Cell, for reproducing the recorded sound. Case provided DeForest with that major upgrade and later provided him with another Case Research Lab creation, the AEO Light, to use for recording the soundtrack. Due to DeForest's continuing misuse of these inventions, the Case Research Lab proceeded to build its own camera. That camera was used by Case and Sponable to film President Coolidge on 11 August 1924, creating one of the films shown by DeForest and claimed by him to be the product of "his" inventions.

Seeing that DeForest was more concerned with his own fame and recognition than he was with actually creating a workable system of sound film, and because of DeForest's continuing attempts to downplay the contributions of the Case Research Lab in the creation of Phonofilm, Case severed his ties with DeForest in the fall of 1925. On 23 July 1926, William Fox of Fox Film Corporation bought Case's patents.

In 1924, Western Electric had settled on 24 frames per second (90 feet per minute) as the standard film speed for both the sound-on-disc and optical sound systems it was developing. Western Electric's ERPI division dominated the theater hardware market when the sound revolution finally got underway, so its new standard speed was universally adopted by Fox and all the other studios as each began making sound films. (See the Fleischer cartoon Finding His Voice (1929), credited to Mr. W. E. Erpi.) As a consequence, Case's tests and DeForest's early Phonofilms, shot at about 21 frames per second, gave speakers and singers laughably high-pitched "helium voices" if they were run on a standard sound projector. The Library of Congress and other film archives have printed new copies of some early Phonofilms, modifying them by periodically duplicating frames and correspondingly "stretching" the soundtracks to make them compatible with standard projectors and telecine equipment.

Producer Pat Powers attempts takeover of Phonofilm
By 1926, DeForest gave up on trying to exploit the process — at least in the U.S. (see UK section below) — and his company declared bankruptcy in September 1926. Without access to Case's inventions, DeForest was left with an incomplete system of sound film. Even so, producer Pat Powers invested in what remained of Phonofilm in the spring of 1927. DeForest was in financial difficulty due to his lawsuits against former associates Case and Owens. At this time, DeForest was selling cut-rate sound equipment to second-run movie theaters wanting to convert to sound on the cheap.

In June 1927, Powers made an unsuccessful takeover bid for DeForest's company. In the aftermath, Powers hired former DeForest technician William Garity to produce a cloned version of the Phonofilm system.

Hollywood chooses other sound systems
While shunning Phonofilm, Hollywood studios introduced different systems for talkies. First up was the sound-on-disc process introduced by Warner Brothers as Vitaphone—which used a record disc synchronized with the film for sound. Warner Brothers released the feature film Don Juan starring John Barrymore on 6 August 1926 in Vitaphone, with music and sound effects only.

On 6 October 1927, Warner Brothers released The Jazz Singer with Al Jolson in Vitaphone. The film is often incorrectly credited as the first talking picture. The Jazz Singer was the first feature film to use synchronized sound for talking sequences rather than just for music and sound effects, and thus launched the talkie era, but DeForest's sound-on-film system was in fact the basis for modern sound movies.

The Fox Movietone system was first demonstrated to the public at the Sam H. Harris Theatre in New York City on 21 January 1927, with a short film of Raquel Meller preceding the feature film What Price Glory?, originally released in November 1926. Later in 1927, producer William Fox introduced sound-on-film with the feature film Sunrise by F. W. Murnau. In 1928, the sound-on-film process RCA Photophone was adopted by newly created studio RKO Radio Pictures and by Paramount Pictures.

Phonofilm in the UK
In 1926, the owner of a UK cinema chain, M. B. Schlesinger, acquired the UK rights to Phonofilm. DeForest and Schlesinger filmed short films of British music hall performers such as Marie Lloyd Jr. and Billy Merson—along with famous stage actors such as Sybil Thorndike and Bransby Williams performing excerpts of works by Shakespeare, Shaw, and Dickens—from September 1926 to May 1929. (In July 1925, The Gentleman, a comedy short film excerpt of The 9 to 11 Revue, directed by William J. Elliott in Phonofilm, was the first sound-on-film production made in England.)

On 4 October 1926, Phonofilm made its UK premiere with a program of short films presented at the Empire Cinema in London, including a short film with Sidney Bernstein welcoming Phonofilm to the UK. According to the British Film Institute website, the UK division of DeForest Phonofilm was taken over in August 1928 by British Talking Pictures and its subsidiary, British Sound Film Productions, which was formed in September 1928, it is believed British Talking Pictures acquired DeForests primary assets, including patents and designs for theatre audio equipment. 

In March 1929, a feature film The Clue of the New Pin, a part-talkie based on an Edgar Wallace novel, was trade-shown with The Crimson Circle, a German-UK coproduction which was also based on a Wallace novel. Crimson was filmed in DeForest Phonofilm, and Pin was made in British Phototone, a sound-on-disc process using 12-inch phonograph records synchronized with the film. However, the UK divisions of both Phonofilm and British Phototone soon closed.

The last films made in the UK in Phonofilm were released in early 1929, due to competition from Vitaphone, and sound-on-film systems such as Fox Movietone and RCA Photophone. The release of Alfred Hitchcock's sound feature film Blackmail in June 1929, made in RCA Photophone, sealed the fate of Phonofilm in the UK.

Phonofilm in Australia
In June 1925, Phonofilm opened its first Australian office at 129 Bathurst Street in Sydney. On 6 July 1925, the first program of Phonofilms in Australia were shown at the Piccadilly Theatre in Sydney. A program was also shown at the Prince Edward Theatre in November and December 1925.

On 6 April 1927, Minister for Trade Herbert Pratten appeared in a DeForest film to celebrate the opening of a Phonofilm studio in Rushcutters Bay in Sydney. On 12 May 1927, a Phonofilm of the Duke and Dutchess of York arriving at Farm Cove, New South Wales was shown at the Lyceum Theater in Sydney.

Unfortunately, Phonofilm had to close all of its operations in Australia by October 1927, and sold its remaining studio facilities to an Australian company in October 1928.

Phonofilm in Spain
In 1928, Spanish producer Feliciano Manuel Vitores bought the Spanish rights to Phonofilm from DeForest and dubbed it "Fonofilm". He produced four films in the process, Cuando fui león (1928), En confesionario (1928), Va usted en punto con el banco (1928), and El misterio de la Puerta del Sol (1929). The first three were short films directed by Manuel Marín starring Spanish comedian Ramper, and the last was the first sound feature film made in Spain. The feature film was released in Spain by Divina Home Video in 2005, after years of being thought a lost film.

Phonofilm in Latin America
The Maurice Zouary collection at the Library of Congress holds approximately 45 films made in Phonofilm. A DVD produced by Zouary about the history of Phonofilm says that a short film of opera singers performing the Sextet from Lucia di Lammermoor was made by the "Latin American division" of Phonofilm. No further information is known about this division of Phonofilm. In 1926, DeForest released a short film referred to as Cuban Sound Documentary which included the Cuban national anthem and excerpts from The Merry Widow. However, little else is known of this film or whether other Phonofilms were made in Cuba.

Legacy of Phonofilm
More than 200 short films were made in the Phonofilm process, with many preserved in the collections of the Library of Congress (45 titles) and the British Film Institute (98 titles). In 1976, five Phonofilm titles were discovered in a trunk in Australia, and these films have been restored by Australia's National Film and Sound Archive.

List of films produced in Phonofilm

 A. C. Astor with Sentimental Mac (1928) ventriloquist Astor (d. April 7, 1966) with his dummy Sentimental MacTribute to Ventriloquism website
 Acci-Dental Treatment (1929) directed by Thomas Bentley with Ernie Lotinga as Jimmy Josser
 The Actors' Squad (1927) short with Lawrence Anderson
 Abraham Lincoln (1924) portrayal of Lincoln by actor Frank McGlynn Sr. in excerpt of 1918 play by John Drinkwater
 Adolph Zukor Introduces Phonofilm (1923) for release of The Covered Wagon and Bella Donna, two Paramount Pictures feature films with soundtracks filmed in Phonofilm
 Ag and Bert (1929) with Mabel Constanduros and Michael Hogan, directed by Bertram Phillips
 Ain't She Sweet (1928) with Chili Bouchier and Dick Henderson; see also Mark Griver and Pilbeam and His Band entries (below)
 Al Herman (1926) comedian Herman (1887-1967) performing a comedy sketch
 Alexander's Ragtime Band (1926) Fleischer cartoon**
 Alma Barnes the Internationally Famous Mimic (1926)
 Almost a Gentleman (1928) comedy short with Billy Bennett
 Alvin and Kelvin Keech (1926) brothers who are credited with the invention of the banjolele (banjo and ukulele)
 America's Flyers (1927) filmed at Roosevelt Field (29 June 1927) with Richard E. Byrd, George Noville, and Bert Acosta, with speech given by Grover Whalen (listed in BFI database)
 Anna Pavlova Swan Dance (1925)
 Annie Laurie (1926)**
 The Antidote (1927) dramatic short directed by Thomas Bentley, with Primrose Morgan, Walter Sondes, and Jameson Thomas***
 Armistice Day of 1928 (1928) produced by Phonofilms (Singapore) and released by British Sound Film Corporation
 Arthur Roberts Sings "Topsey-Turvey" (April 1927) musical short with Arthur Roberts singing "Topsey-Turvey", directed by Bertram Phillips
 As We Lie (1927) comedy short with Lillian Hall-Davis and Miles Mander, directed by Mander; also known as Lost One Wife Ashton and Rawson (May 1928) Doris Ashton and Billy Rawson; Ashton sings and Rawson plays piano (BFI Database)
 At the Photographer's (1929) comedy short released by Ellbee Pictures
 An Attempted Duet (1928) comedy short with Beryl Beresford and Leslie Hinton
 Barber and Jackson in The Long and the Short of It (1922) with Barber and Jackson, male and female duo (first names unknown)
 Bard and Pearl (1923) Wilkie Bard and Jack Pearl in early tests for Phonofilm (in UCLA Film and Television Archive database)
 Barking Dog (1921) experimental film with barking dog
 The Barrister (June 1928) with George Robey, directed by Hugh Croise
 Being All Alone (1927)
 Bella Donna (1923) Paramount Pictures feature film directed by George Fitzmaurice and starring Pola Negri and Conway Tearle
 Ben Bernie and All the Lads (1925) with Oscar Levant on piano
 Bernice DePasquale (1922) Metropolitan Opera soprano
 Betty Chester the Well-Known Star of The Co-Optimists (1926) Chester sings "Pig-Tail Alley"
 Billy Merson Singing Desdemona (1926)
 Billy Merson in Scotland's Whiskey (1927) parody of Sir Harry Lauder
 Billy Merson in Russian Opera (1927)
 Bleak House (1926) aka Grandfather Smallweed, the Miser (UK title) with Bransby Williams***
 Boat Race (1929) The Oxford and Cambridge University Boat Race of 23 March 1929 ("centenary year") listed in BFI Database
 Boheme Blue (1927) musical short
 A Boston Star: Borrah Minnevitch (1923) harmonicist*
 The Bride (1929) comedy short with George Robey
 Bring on the Bride (August 1929) comedy short, directed by Harry Delf, with Betty Lancaster, Cecil Holm, and Edward O'Connor
 Brooke Johns and Goodee Montgomery (1925) Johns plays ukulele and Montgomery sings "I'm in Love Again" and dances***
 The Burglar and the Girl (1928) comedy short with Moore Marriott and Dorothy Boyd
 By the Light of the Silvery Moon (1926) the last of the Fleischer "Song Car-Tunes" with Phonofilm, released August 1926 **
 Call Me Up Some Rainy Afternoon (1926)**
 Calm as the Night (1927) sung by soprano Mary Cavanova (Marie Cavan)
 Canoodling (1928) Hal Jones sings song "Canoodling" from stage review Splinters Carrie From Lancasheer (October 1928)
 Carson and Shean (1926) ?Carson and Al Shean (SilentEra and BFI Database)
 Casey at the Bat (1922) famous poem read by actor DeWolf Hopper
 Cellist and Pianist (1928) two women play Saint-Saëns' "The Swan" from Carnival of the Animals; ?same as Jerome and France (see below)
 Charles Lindbergh (1927) filmed at Clapham Studios in London on Lindbergh's departure from the UK
 Charles Lindbergh Reception (1927) Lindbergh receives Medal of Valor from NYC mayor Jimmy Walker on June 13, 1927
 Charles Ross Taggart (1923) "The Old Country Fiddler at the Singing School" *
 Charles William Eliot (1924) former president of Harvard University gives speech (?at 1924 Democratic Convention)
 Charles "Chic" Sale (1922) "famed monologist"
 Charmaine (1928) musical short with Eric Marshall singing
 Chorus Gentlemen (1926) or Chorus, Gentlemen! Christmas Party (UK, December 1928) with Fred Elizalde and his Orchestra
 Clapham and Dwyer No. 1 (1929) Charles Clapham and Bill Dwyer
 Clapham and Dwyer No. 2 (1929) Charles Clapham and Bill Dwyer
 The Cleaner (1928) comedy short with Wilkie Bard
 Clonk! (1928) musical short with Arty Ash and Leslie Sarony, directed by Widgey R. Newman
 Clyde Doerr and His Sax-o-Phone Sextet (1923)
 The Coffee Stall (1927) Mark Lupino (c. 1894-4 April 1930) and Company, directed by George A. Cooper
 Cohen on the Telephone (1923) also known as Monroe Silver, Famed Monologist with monologist Monroe Silver*
 Come Take a Trip in My Airship (1924) one of the first in the Fleischer "Song Car-Tune" series**
 Comin' Thro' the Rye (1926)**
 Conchita Piquer (1923) in dance sketch "From Far Seville"*
 The Covered Wagon (1923) Paramount Pictures feature directed by James Cruze
 Cuando fui león (1928) Spanish producer purchased rights from DeForest for "Fonofilm"
 Cuban Sound Documentary (1926) with the Cuban national anthem and excerpts of The Merry Widow Daisy Bell (1925)**
 Dandy George and Rosie (1927) Dandy George (Albert George Spink) and his dog Rosie
 Darling Nelly Gray (1926)**
 David Gusikoff (1924) vibraphonist
 Der rote Kreis (1929) aka The Crimson Circle, UK-German feature based on Edgar Wallace novel, trade-shown in March 1929 in the UK
 Dick Henderson Sings "I Love Her All the More" (1926)
 Dick Henderson Sings "Tripe" (1926)
 Dick Henderson Sings "There Are More Heavens Than One" (1927)
 Die Nibelungen (1924), part I, "Siegfried" (only at the U.S. premiere in NYC on August 23, 1925)
 Dixie (1925)**
 Doing His Duty (1929) comedy short of Ernie Lotinga playing "Jimmy Josser", directed by Hugh Croise
 Dolly Gray (1926)**
 Domen (1924) Swedish language version of Retribution (1924), directed by Arthur Donaldson, Swedish actor and director
 Donald Brian (1925) in Peggy O'Hooligan Downey and Owens (1925) Morton Downey (Sr.) and ?Owens ("Two Boys and a Piano") sing "Show Me the Way to Go Home" and "There Is No One Like Myself"
 The Duke and Duchess of York Arrive at Farm Cove (1927) film first shown 12 May 1927 at the Lyceum in Sydney, Australia
 Dunio and Gegna (1927) instrumental comedians, play "Yes Sir, That's My Baby" on violin and cello (BFI Database)
 Drink to Me Only (1926) Gwen Farrar (1899-1944) sings title song
 East Side, West Side (1925) also known as "The Sidewalks of New York" **
 Edith Sitwell (1927) reads from her work
 El misterio de la Puerta del Sol (1929) first sound feature film made in Spain
 Elga Collins the Versatile Entertainer (1927) Collins sings "Ain't It Nice" and "Tonight You Belong to Me"
 Emmie Joyce Sings "I Need Love" (1927)
 Emmie Joyce Sings "Patience" (1927)
 En confesionario (1928)
 Ethel Hook (1926) song by contralto Ethel Hook, sister of classical singer Clara Butt
 Eubie Blake Plays His "Fantasy on Swanee River" (1923)
 Eva Puck and Sammy White (1923) doing their sketch "Opera vs. Jazz" *
 Everybody's Doing It (1926) **
 The Fair Maid of Perth (1926) live-action UK film with Louise Maurel, directed by Miles Mander
 False Colours (1927) dramatic short with Ursula Jeans and A. B. Imeson, directed by Miles Mander
 Fannie Ward (1924) Fannie Ward sings "Father Time"
 Fannie Ward (1924) performs comedy sketch as the "Perennial Flapper"
 Farewell Message of Mr. Levine and Captain Hinchcliffe, Just Before Their Departure on Their Return Flight to America (1927) with Charles A. Levine and Capt. Walter G. R. Hinchliffe
 Femina Quartette Nr. 1 (1928) with Elizabeth Hyde (soprano), Brenda Hales (cellist), Yvonne Black (pianist) performing (BFI Database)
 A Few Moments With Eddie Cantor, Star of "Kid Boots" (late 1923, early 1924)
 The Fire Brigade (October 1928) with Robb Wilton
 Five Minutes with Al Smith (1924) Franklin D. Roosevelt introduces Smith at 1924 Democratic Convention
 The Flat Charleston (1926) with Santos Casani and Josie Lennard
 The 'Flu That Flew (May 1928)
 Flying Jenny Airplane (1921) experimental film with Curtiss JN-4 ("Jenny") airplane
 The Four Bachelors (1924) singing quartet
 Franklin D. Roosevelt Speech (1924) filmed at 1924 Democratic National Convention in NYC
 Frivolous Fragments (1927) comedy sketch with Alec Daimler and Dora Eadie
 Futuritzy (24 June 1928) Felix the Cat short, directed by Otto Messmer, produced by Pat Sullivan, released by Educational Pictures; re-released in 1929 by Copley Pictures
 The Gentleman (1925) first sound-on-film UK film, directed by William J. Elliott, excerpt of The 9 to 11 Revue by Harold Simpson and Morris Harvey
 George Bernard Shaw (1927) one year before similar film Greeting by George Bernard Shaw released by Fox Movietone News in June 1928
 George Jackley (1885-1950), the Indignant Comedian in "A Doggy Ditty" (1927)
 George Jessel (1924) comedy sketch by Jessel
 Gilland Singer (1927) M. Gilland from France sings, dressed as wounded World War I soldier
 Gimme the Hat (1927)
 Gloria Swanson Dialogue (1925), Gloria Swanson, Henri de la Falaise, and Thomas Meighan directed by Allan Dwan, in film for The Lambs annual "Spring Gambol" presented at the Metropolitan Opera House, showing Swanson trying to crash the all-male club; Meighan also hosted the live Gambol event (26 April 1925)
 Goodbye My Lady Love (1924)**
 Gordon Freeman (1924) and his "crazy inventions"
 Gorno's Italian Marionettes (1928) aka Die singenden MarionettenAntti Alanen Film Diary entry
 Gwen Farrar (1899-1944) cellist Farrar performs "Drink to Me Only With Thine Eyes" (1926)
 Gwen Farrar and songwriter Billy Mayerl perform "I've Got a Sweetie on the Radio" (1926)
 Hal Brown Lancashire Comedian (1928)
 The Harlequin's Serenade (no further identification of performer; in original April 15, 1923 program)*
 Harrigan and Altworth (1922) early DeForest test film
 Harry and Max Nesbitt (1927) film sometimes listed as "Yid Nesbitt" (Max's nickname), brothers from South Africa in "vocal, verbal, and terpsichorean tidbits"
 Harry Shalson the Popular Entertainer (1927) Shalson sings "You Go Too Far"
 Has Anybody Here Seen Kelly? (1926) Fleischer cartoon originally with green and orange tinting **
 The Hawaiian Revellers (1928) with Kahola Marsh and His Hawaiian Orchestra
 Hedicashun (1929) monologue by A. W. Goodwin
 Helen Lewis and Her All-Girl Jazz Syncopators (1925) Lewis leads her all-female band
 Helen Menken (1925) Broadway star Helen Menken
 Henry Cass Demonstration Film (1923)* also at the Engineers Society Auditorium in NYC on April 12, 1923
 Her Unborn Child (1930) last feature film made in Phonofilm, directed by Albert Ray (screen debut of Elisha Cook)
 His Night Out (1924) comedy short with Fred Ardath, Bob Albright, and The McCarthy Sisters
 His Rest Day (1927) comedy short directed by George A. Cooper with Matthew Boulton as Bill Gosling
 Hot Tips (1929) comedy short released by Ellbee Pictures
 Hot Water and Vegetabuel (1928) Leslie Sarony sings "When You're Up to Your Neck in Hot Water (Think of the Kettle and Sing)"
 The Houston Sisters (1926) musical short with Billie and Renee Houston
 The Hyde Sisters (1928) musical short with The Hyde Sisters
 I Can't Take You Out of My Dreams (1926) Winnie Collins and Walter Williams sing title song
 I Don't Believe You're in Love With Me (1926) Winnie Collins and Walter Williams sing title song
 I Don't Care What You Used to Be (1927) Dick Henderson sings title song
 I Don't Know (1928) Emmie Joyce sings title song
 I Love a Lassie (1925) **
 I Want a Pie with a Plum In (1926) Dick Henderson sings title song by Wal Clifford
 In the Good Old Summer Time (1926) **
 An Intimate Interlude (1928) comedy short with Albert Whelan
 I've Never Seen a Straight Banana (1926) sung by Dick Henderson, song by Ted Waite
 J. H. Squires' Celesta Octet (1928) aka "Memories of Tschaikovsky" w/The Squires Octet
 Jack Pearl and Ben Bard (1926) with Bard, Pearl, and Sascha Beaumont
 Jerome and France (1928) cellist with pianist; ?same as "Cellist and Pianist" (see above)
 Joe Termini the Somnolent Melodist (1926) specialty musician performs on violin and banjo
 Joe Theiss Saxotette (1929)
 John Citizen's Lament (1927) Charles Paton performs song "If Your Face Wants to Smile, We'll Let It In" from revue John Citizen's Lament John W. Davis Campaign Speech (1924), Democratic candidate who lost to Coolidge
 Josephine Earle (UK, February 1929) musical short; re-released as part of compilation film Musical Medley No. 4 (1932)
 Josser, KC (1929) comedy short with Ernie Lotinga playing "Jimmy Josser" (possible duplicate of Doing His Duty)
 The Jubilee Four (1924) gospel quartet
 Julius Caesar (1926) excerpt from the Shakespeare play, with Basil Gill as Brutus and Malcolm Keen as Cassius
 Key and Heyworth (1927) duo sing a song (BFI Database)
 Knee Deep in Daisies (1926) song "I'm Knee-Deep in Daisies (and Head Over Heels in Love)" sung by Paul England and Dorothy Boyd
 Kollege Kapers (1929) comedy short written and directed by Bobby Harmon
 La Chauve-Souris (1923) Nikita Balieff's group La Chauve-Souris performing their sketch "Parade of the Wooden Soldiers" (? with Technicolor sequence)*
 Lee DeForest (1922) DeForest sitting in a chair and explaining Phonofilm
 Léon Rothier (1923), operatic bass from the Metropolitan Opera
 Lillian Powell Bubble Dance (1923)* Denishawn dancer Powell dances to a theme by Brahms; film also shown at the Engineers Society Auditorium in NYC April 12, 1923***
 Lincoln, Man of the People (1923) Edwin Markham reads his poem "Lincoln, Man of the People"
 The London Four (1927) male voice quartet
 Love's Old Sweet Song (1923) two-reeler with Louis Wolheim, Donald Gallaher, and Una Merkel, cinematography by Freeman Harrison Owens
 Luella Paikin (1922) early DeForest test film of singer
 Lulu (1928) musical short
 Luna-cy! (1925) 1922 experimental 3-D film by Frederick Ives and Jacob Leventhal re-released with Phonofilm soundtrack 18 May 1925
 Madelon (1927) Camille Gillard in "Madelon", directed by Widgey Newman
 Major Issues of the Campaign (1924) compilation of Al Smith, Franklin D. Roosevelt, and John W. Davis short Phonofilms taken at the 1924 Democratic National Convention in NYC (see individual entries)
 The Man in the Street (1926) short based on Louis N. Parker play, directed by Thomas Bentley, with Wilbur Lenton, John MacAndrews, and Bunty O'Nolan (UK title: Man of Mystery)
 Margie (1926)**
 Marie Lloyd (1926) starring Marie Lloyd Jr., daughter of music hall star Marie Lloyd
 Marie Rappold (1922) Metropolitan Opera star
 Mark Griver and His Scottish Revellers (1927) perform "She Was Just a Sailor's Sweetheart" and "Ain't She Sweet"—see also Chili Bouchier entry (above) and Pilbeam and His Band entry (below)
 Max Herzberg (1924) pianist
 Medevedeff's Balalaika Orchestra (1929)
 Meet the Family (1929) comedy short with Harry Delf, released by Ellbee Pictures
 Memories of Lincoln (1925) 91-year-old former legislator Chauncey Depew recalls meeting Abraham Lincoln
 The Merchant of Venice (1927) the trial scene, with Joyce Lyons and Lewis Casson, perhaps the first sound-on-film reproduction of a scene from a Shakespeare play
 Mickey (1927) **
 Mira la Blanca Luna (UK/Czech, 1936) Rossini aria sung by tenor Otakar Mařák and soprano Marie Cavan (Mary Cavanova)
 Mirth and Magic (1928) unidentified magician performs his magic act
 Miss Edith Kelly-Lange (1927) violin solo
 Miss Lalla Dodd, the Modern Soubrette (1927)
 Molly Picon (1924) famed Yiddish actress
 Mother, Mother, Mother Pin a Rose on Me (1924) **
 Mr. George Mozart the Famous Comedian (1928) comedy short 
 Mr. Smith Wakes Up (1929) comedy short with Elsa Lanchester
 Mrs. Mephistopheles (1929) comedy short with George Robey as title character, directed by Hugh Croise
 A Musical Monologue (1923) with Phil Baker and his accordion*
 My Bonnie (1925) aka My Bonnie Lies Over the Ocean **
 My Old Kentucky Home (1926) first to use "Follow the Bouncing Ball" **
 My Wife's Gone to the Country (1926)**
Nan Wild (November 1927) directed by George A. Cooper
 Nap (1928) with Ernie Lotinga as Josser, directed by Hugh Croise
 Nervo and Knox (1926) perform their song "The Love of Phtohtenese" (pronounced "Hot Knees")
 The New Paris Lido Club Band (1928) directed by Bertram Phillips
 A Night in Dixie (1925) musical short in Maurice Zouary collection (Library of Congress
 The Nightingale's Courtship (1927) French clowns, the Plattier Brothers
 The Nightwatchman (1928) with Wilkie Bard singing his song "The Night Watchman"
 Noble Sissle and Eubie Blake (1923) perform their song "Affectionate Dan" and "All God's Chillen Got Shoes"
 Noble Sissle and Eubie Blake Sing Snappy Songs (1923) sing "Sons of Old Black Joe" and "My Swanee Home"
 Norah Blaney (1927) Blaney plays piano and sings "He's Funny That Way" and "How About Me"
 Nutcracker Suite (1925) **
 Oh! How I Hate to Get Up in the Morning (1926) **
 Oh I Wish I Was in Michigan (1927) **
 Oh Mabel (1924) early entry in the Fleischer "Sound Car-Tune" series **
 Oh What a Pal Was Mary (1926)**
 Oh Suzanna (1925)**
 Oh, You Beautiful Doll (1926) **
 Old Black Joe (1926) **
 Old Folks at Home (1925) ?dupe of "Swanee" entry below **
 Old Pal Why Don't You Answer Me (1926) also sometimes listed as "My Old Pal" of "Dear Old Pal"**
 Olly Oakley (November 1927) directed by George A. Cooper; banjoist Oakley was born Joseph Sharpe (b. Birmingham November 26, 1877; d. London January 4, 1943)
 The Orderly Room (July 1928) comedy short with Ernie Lotinga as Jimmy Josser, directed by Hugh Croise
 Oscar Earlweiss (1924) "chorus and novelty concert"
 Pack Up Your Troubles in Your Old Kit-Bag (1926) Fleischer cartoon **
 Packing Up (1927) dramatic short with Mary Clare and Malcolm Keen, directed by Miles Mander
 Paul Specht Musical Number (1925)
 Peace and Quiet (1929) with Ralph Lynn and Winifred Shotter, directed by Sinclair Hill, play by Ronald Jeans
 Percival and Hill (1927)
 The Percival Mackey Trio (1929) directed by Bertram Phillips
 Percy Pryde and His Phonofiddle on the Phonofilm (1928)
 Philip Ritte and His Revellers (1927)
 Phonofilm (1923) with Binnie Barnes
 Pilbeam and His Band With Specialty Dance by the Misses Tosch (1927) jazzy version of "Ain't She Sweet?" (?Arnold Pilbeam, father of Nova Pilbeam). See Chili Bouchier entry and Mark Griver entry (above) which feature same song.
 Pipe Down (1929) comedy short released by Ellbee Pictures
 Plastigrams (1924) 1922 experimental 3-D film by Frederick Ives and Jacob Leventhal, re-released with Phonofilm soundtrack on 22 September 1924
 President Calvin Coolidge, Taken on the White House Grounds (1924) filmed 11 August 1924
 Punch and Judy (1928)
 The Radio Bug (September 1926) comedy short, produced by Jack White, directed by Stephen Roberts, and co-starring Phil Dunham, Toy Gallagher and Clem Beauchamp, about delivery of a new radio, released in sound and silent versions by Educational Pictures
 The Radio Franks (May 1926) NYC radio stars Frank Bessinger and Frank Wright sing "Remember" and "Hooray for Radio" ***
 The Raw Recruit (July 1928) comedy short with Ernie Lotinga as Jimmy Josser, directed by Hugh Croise
 Raymond Hitchcock Sketch (1924)
 Retribution (1924) directed by Arthur Donaldson, Swedish actor and director, see also Domen (1924)
 Rigoletto, Act Two (1923) with opera singer Eva Leoni (1895–1972) shown in NYC on 12 April and 15 April 1923; released in the UK in September 1926 *
 Robert M. La Follette Sr. (1924) speech given during 1924 presidential campaign
 Rocky Road to Dublin (1927) **
 Roger Wolfe Kahn Musical Number (1925)
 Romeo et Juliette (1927) tenor Otakar Mařák and soprano Mary Cavanova (Marie Cavan)
 Safety First (1928) George Robey singing his song "Safety First", directed by Hugh Croise
 Sailing, Sailing Over the Bounding Main (1925) **
 Saint Joan (1927) cathedral scene from Shaw's play, with Sybil Thorndike
 The Samehtini Trio (1927) two ballads and Hungarian dance (possibly Csárdás (Monti)) performed by male trio (pianist, cellist, and vocalist)
 Sammy Fain and Artie Dunn (1923) before Fain quit to become full-time songwriter
 Santa Claus (1926) with Basil Gill as Santa Claus
 Scovell and Wheldon (1927) UK radio stars (male duo) sing "Ukulele Lullaby" and "Fresh Milk Comes From Cows"
 Scrooge (1928), a monologue from Dickens's A Christmas Carol, with Bransby Williams as Scrooge
 Sensations of 1927 (1927) Thorpe Bates in excerpt of Lawrence Wright's Sensations of 1927; full title A Few Melodious Moments From Lawrence Wright's "Sensations of 1927" at Onchan Head Pavilion Douglas, I.O.M. (BFI Database)
 The Sentence of Death (1927) dramatic short directed by Miles Mander and starring Dorothy Boyd (US title: His Great Moment)
 Sextet from Lucia di Lammermoor (1923) DVD by Zouary shows it to be produced by the ?"Latin American division" of Phonofilm
 The Sheik of Araby (US, September 1926) Fleischer cartoon **
 The Sheik of Araby (UK, December 1926) live-action short directed in the UK by Miles Mander
 Sidney Bernstein Welcomes Phonofilm (1926) shown 4 October 1926 at the Empire Cinema in London
 So Blue (1927) with ?Delys and Clark
 Songs of Yesterday (1922) spirituals sung by Abbie (Abbey) Mitchell
 Sonia Serova Dancers (1924) modern dance group performs to Edvard Grieg's "Song of Spring"
 Spirits (1929) comedy short with Ernie Lotinga as Jimmy Josser
 The Stage Hands (1928) comedy short
 Stringed Harmony (1923) with ukulele and banjo player Roy Smeck*
 The Sugar Step (1928)
 The Superior Sex (1928) comedy short with John Henry
 Swanee River (1925)**
 Sweet Adeline (1926) **
 Syncopation and Song (1927) with The Coney Island Six
 The Tale-Teller Phone (1928) comedy short with Nita Alvarez, Athalie Davis, and Philip Desborough
 Ta-Ra-Ra-Boom-Dee-Aye (1926)**
 Teddy Brown (1927)
 Teddy Brown, Xylophonist (1929)
 That Brute Simmons (1928) comedy short with Frank Stanmore, Forrester Harvey, and Barbara Gott
 The Third Gun (1929) three-reel short directed by Geoffrey Barkas
 Thorpe Bates (1926)
 The Three Rascals and a Piano (1927)
 To See If My Dreams Come True (1927) Jack Hodges sings title song
 Tommy Lorne and "Dumplings" (1927)
 Tommy Lorne (1927) sings "The Lard Song"
 Toot Toot (1926) Fleischer cartoon ("Toot Toot Tootsie"?)**
 Topsey-Turvey (1927) comedian Arthur Roberts sings "Topsey-Turvey", directed by Bertram Phillips
 The Toy Shop (1928)
 The Trail of the Lonesome Pine (1927) **
 Tramp, Tramp, Tramp the Boys Are Marching (1926) **
 The Trial Turn (1928) comedy short with Horace Kenney
 Troy Fassett (1924) comedy short
 Tulipsky (1924) pianist (famed "peonyist")
 Tumbledown Shack in Athlone (1927) **
 Two Sisters (1929) with Rex Lease and Viola Dana
 Unmasked (1929) mystery feature film directed by Edgar Lewis (released by Weiss Brothers-Artclass Films)
 The Unwritten Law (UK, 1929) two-reel short directed by Sinclair Hill at Wembley Studios
 Va usted en punto con el banco (1928)
 Ventriloquist (1927) with William Frawley as peddler hawking "Hoak" patent medicine and girl (real-life wife Edna Frawley) who becomes the dummy (BFI database)
 Vicarage Trio—Kerbstone Entertainment (1928)
 The Victoria Girls (1928) perform "The Doll Dance", their "famous dancing medley"
 Violet Heming (1925) appeared in "playlet" filmed in Phonofilm (Variety, September 1925)
 Waiting for the Robert E. Lee (1927) **
 Weber and Fields (1923) doing their pool hall sketch *
 Westminster Glee Singers (1927) group directed by Edward Branscombe
 What the Phonofilm Means (introduced by ?Bart Doyle; in original April 15, 1923 program)*
 When I Leave This World Behind (1926) **
 When I Lost You (1926) **
 When That Yiddisher Band Played an Irish Tune (1926) with Teddy Elben and His Irish JewzaleersBFI Database entry
 When the Midnight Choo-Choo Leaves for Alabam' (1926)**
 The Whistler (1926) dramatic short with Louise Maurel, John F. Hamilton, and Reginald Fox, directed by Miles Mander
 Why Bananas? (1926) with Teddy Elben
 Wyn Gladwyn, One Person Two Personalities (1928)
 Yak-A-Hula-Hick-A-Doola (1926) **
 Yorke and Adams (1927) Augustus Yorke (1860-1939) and Nicholas Adams perform Potash and Perlmutter You and I and My Gondola (1927)
 Yvette Darnac (1929) radio star Darnac sings Gershwin tune "The Man I Love"

(*) Included in program of Phonofilms at the Rivoli Theater in NYC on 15 April 1923(**) Fleischer "Song Car-Tunes" series (some titles later re-released by the Fleischers in their "Screen Songs" series, through Paramount Pictures, with new soundtracks recorded in RCA Photophone)(***) Found in a trunk in Windsor, New South Wales, Australia in early 1976, and restored by the National Film and Sound Archive of Australia

See also
 Vitaphone
 Movietone
 RCA Photophone
 Photokinema
 A Few Moments With Eddie Cantor, Star of "Kid Boots"
 Cohen on the Telephone
 Theodore Case Sound Test: Gus Visser and his Singing Duck
 Eric Tigerstedt
 Tri-Ergon
 Joseph Tykociński-Tykociner
 Sound film
 Sound-on-disc
 List of film formats
 List of film sound systems

References

External links
 List of DeForest Phonofilm titles at IMDB
 List of Cinephone films (includes earlier Cinephone system not related to Powers Cinephone) at IMDB
 List of DeForest Phonofilm titles at BFI Database
 History of DeForest inventions including Phonofilm
 Copy of DeForest Phonofilm Corporation stock certificate with section of film from The Covered Wagon (1923) showing soundtrack
 Australian National Film Archive website
 Ben Bernie and All the Lads (1924) led by Ben Bernie with Oscar Levant on piano, made in Phonofilm
 President Coolidge, Taken on the White House Lawn (filmed on 11 August 1924) at Archive.org
 A Few Moments With Eddie Cantor, Star of "Kid Boots" (premiere of Broadway show Kid Boots in late 1923 or early 1924 in NYC) at Archive.org
 Sissle and Blake Sing Snappy Songs (1923)
 The Victoria Girls (1928) performing "The Doll Dance" at YouTube (clip has incorrect date of 1930) filmed at Phonofilm Clapham Studios in London
 Mark Griver and His Scottish Revellers (1927) filmed at the Phonofilm Clapham Studios in London
 Dick Henderson Sings I Love Her All the More (1926) filmed at the Phonofilm Clapham Studios in London
 Billy Merson Sings Desdemona (1927) filmed at Clapham Studios in London
 List of Early Sound Films 1894-1929 at Silent Era website

Film sound production
Film and video technology
History of film
Motion picture film formats
Phonofilm short films